The UCI Track Cycling World Cup – Women's team pursuit are the World Cup team pursuit for women races held at the UCI Track Cycling World Cup. The first competition of this event for women was at the 2007–2008 UCI Track Cycling World Cup Classics. The distance raced is 3 kilometres, or twelve laps on a typical indoor velodrome track.

Medalists

2007–2008

2008–2009

2009–2010

2010–2011

2011–2012

2012–2013

2013–2014

References

 
UCI Track Cycling World Cup